is a private junior college in Shimonoseki, Yamaguchi, Japan. The school opened in 1962 as a women's junior college with enrollment of 32 students. In 2001 it became coeducational, adopting the present name at the same time.

External links
 Official website 

Educational institutions established in 1962
Private universities and colleges in Japan
Universities and colleges in Yamaguchi Prefecture
Shimonoseki
Japanese junior colleges
1962 establishments in Japan